Gulzat Uralbayeva (born December 4, 1989 in Astana) is a Kazakhstani judoka, who played for the lightweight category. At age eighteen, Uralbayeva became the youngest judoka to represent Kazakhstan for the 2008 Summer Olympics, where she competed in the women's lightweight class (57 kg). She lost the first preliminary match to United States' Valerie Gotay, who successfully scored an ippon and a te gatame (hand arm lock), at one minute and forty-six seconds.

References

External links

NBC Olympics Profile

Kazakhstani female judoka
Living people
Olympic judoka of Kazakhstan
Judoka at the 2008 Summer Olympics
Sportspeople from Astana
1989 births
Judoka at the 2006 Asian Games
Asian Games competitors for Kazakhstan
21st-century Kazakhstani women